PANOS is a discontinued computer operating system developed by Acorn Computers in the 1980s and released in 1985, which ran on the 32016 Second Processor for the BBC Micro and the Acorn Cambridge Workstation. These systems had essentially the same architecture, based on a 32-bit NS32016 CPU; the ACW having a BBC Micro-based "I/O processor". Access to the I/O processor was through a NS32016 firmware kernel called Pandora.

Panos ran on the NS32016 and was a rudimentary single-user operating system, written in Modula-2. It provided a simple command line interpreter, a text editor and access to DFS, ADFS or NFS file systems via the I/O processor. Targeted at the academic and scientific user community, it came bundled with compilers for the FORTRAN 77, C, Pascal and LISP programming languages.

Commands 
The following list of commands is supported by the Panos command line interpreter.

 .space
 .Delete
 .Help
 .key
 .NewCommand
 .Obey
 .pwd
 .Quit
 .Run
 .Set
 .swd
 .wait

 Access
 Catalogue
 Configure
 Copy
 Create
 Delete
 Echo
 Logon
 Rename
 Set
 Show
 Star

References

Notes

Acorn operating systems
Discontinued operating systems